Manish (also Maneesh) (Devanagari: मनिष or मनीष) is a common Hindu masculine given name that literally means "The God of the Mind" or the one who has controlled and mastered one's mind (representing an intellectual, genius, etc.), derived from the Sanskrit words "man" (mann) which means Mind and "ish" which refers to God or master.
Many Hindu male children are given this name. It is a popular name in central and northern parts of India.

Notable persons with this given name
Maneesh Agrawala (born 1973), American computer scientist
Maneesh Sharma, Indian film director
Manish Acharya (1967–2010), Indian film director and actor
Manish Arora, Indian fashion designer
Manish Bhasin, British sports journalist
Manish Bhargav (born 1994), Indian footballer
Manish Dayal, American actor
Manish Ghatak (1902–1979), Indian poet and novelist
Manish Gupta (director), Indian writer and director
Manish Gupta (politician), Indian politician
Manish Jha (born 1978), Indian film director and screenwriter
Manish Joshi Bismil, Indian theatre director
Manish Kaushik (voice actor) (born 1980), Indian voice-dubbing artist
Manish Maithani (born 1987), Indian football player
Manish Makhija (born 1968), Indian VJ and restaurateur
Manish Malhotra (born 1965), Indian fashion Designer
Manish Paul (born 1978), Indian actor
Manish Pandey (born 1989), Indian cricketer
Manish Pitambare (1975–2006), Indian soldier
Manish Raisinghani (born 1979), Indian actor and model
Manish Sharma (cricketer) (born 1981), Indian cricketer
Manish Sisodia (born 1972), Indian social activist
Manish Tewari, Indian politician
Manish Vatsalya (born 1980), Indian actor and filmmaker

See also
Personal name
Given name
Indian name
List of most popular given names

Masculine given names
Given names